United Nations Security Council Resolution 1569, adopted unanimously on 26 October 2004, after invoking Article 28 of the United Nations Charter, the Council decided to hold a two-day meeting on the situation in Sudan in Nairobi, Kenya.

The meeting would take place on 18–19 November 2004, with discussions on the conflict in Darfur and civil war in Southern Sudan. Furthermore, the resolution stated that representatives of the African Union and Intergovernmental Authority on Development would be present at the meeting, which would also discuss other peace efforts in the region.

The meeting was the eleventh time the Security Council had met away from its headquarters in New York City, and the first time it had met in Nairobi.

See also
 African Union Mission in Sudan
 United Nations–African Union Mission in Darfur
 International response to the War in Darfur
 List of United Nations Security Council Resolutions 1501 to 1600 (2003–2005)
 United Nations Mission in Sudan
 War in Darfur

References

External links
 
Text of the Resolution at undocs.org

 1569
2004 in Sudan
 1569
October 2004 events